Cyclocoeloma is a genus of crabs in the family Majidae, containing the single species Cyclocoeloma tuberculata.

Description
Cyclocoeloma tuberculata is a small size spider crab, its carapace reach an average length of 45mm from the rostral area to posterior tip. The back side of the carapace is rounded but the rostral area is going relatively far ahead and looks like a head with lateral position of the eyes.
However, it's quite difficult to observe the carapace's shape on a living animal because it's covered with anemones.
The four ambulacry, when not too much decorated, are creamy color with brown bands. In the majids, the decoration is fixed on the carapace and legs via hooked hairs. The claws are quite small and are also used to decorate themselves.
The reason they cover their body is to camouflage themselves from potential predators, especially during the day; C. tuberculata fixes sea anemones of the family Discosomatidae to its carapace, and soft corals of the family Xeniidae to its legs.

Distribution
Cyclocoeloma tuberculata is widespread throughout the tropical waters of the central Indo-Pacific region.

References

External links

 

Majoidea
Monotypic decapod genera